Baban was a Kurdish principality (1649–1850) in present-day Iraqi Kurdistan.

Baban may also refer to:

 Baban (film)
 Baban, Iran, a village in Iran
 Baban, Albania, a village in Albania

Baban is a primarily Kurdish surname. It is the surname of the following people:
 Ahmad Mukhtar Baban (1900-1976), prime minister of Iraq
 Ali Baban, Iraqi minister
 Breda Baban (1952–2012), Serbian filmmaker and artist
 Cihad Baban (1911-1984), Turkish journalist and parliamentary deputy
 Gracián Babán (1620-1675), Spanish composer
 József Babán (b. 1935), Hungarian ice hockey player
 Marian Băban (b. 1976), Romanian sprint canoer
 Serwan Baban (b. 1958), Kurdish professor and minister
 Taha Baban, Kurdish writer and artist

Baban is the given name of:
 Baban Singh, Nepali politician